The Moonlight was a schooner that sank in Lake Superior off the coast of Michigan Island. The wreckage site was added to the National Register of Historic Places in 2008.

History
Moonlight was built in 1874. In addition to service in the Great Lakes, Moonlight also sailed in the Atlantic Ocean. In 1894 she was involved in an accident with SS Ohio which was sunk.  She sank in September 1903 in a storm while hauling iron ore from Ashland, Wisconsin. In use as a tow barge, Moonlight was under tow by the steamer Volunteer. Both ships were loaded with iron ore in Ashland and were headed for their destination when a violent storm erupted and ruptured the seams of Moonlight's hull.

References

Shipwrecks on the National Register of Historic Places in Wisconsin
1874 ships
Shipwrecks of Lake Superior
Schooner barges
National Register of Historic Places in Ashland County, Wisconsin
Ships built in Milwaukee
Schooners of the United States
Shipwreck discoveries by Jerry Eliason, Ken Merryman and Kraig Smith